
Radius Ensemble is a classical music chamber group based in Cambridge, Massachusetts.  The mission of Radius Ensemble is to reinvigorate classical music for a new generation.

Accessibility is a fundamental philosophy of Radius.  The group eschews the stuffiness and elitism often associated with chamber music and seeks to attract a new, generally younger and more informal, audience to its performances.  The ensemble's primary performance venue is MIT's Killian Hall with occasional outreach concerts at various locations in the Greater Boston area.  Radius Ensemble also performs one free family-oriented concert every spring.

Radius was founded in 1999 by Jennifer Montbach who (as of the 2008-2009 season) continues as the group's artistic director and oboist.

Personnel 
There are nine core members of the Radius Ensemble. The core personnel for the 2008-2009 season are Sarah Bob on piano, Miriam Bolkosky on violoncello, Sarah Brady on flute, Eran Egozy on clarinet, Anne Howarth on French horn, Jae Young Cosmos Lee on violin, Jennifer Montbach on oboe,  and Gregory Newton on bassoon.  The ninth core position (viola) is not filled for the 2008-2009 season.  Additional musicians are engaged as the repertoire demands.

Artistic Diversity 
Radius Ensemble plays a diverse blend of standard repertoire and more modern music, occasionally venturing into realms that could be classified as experimental.  Further variety and flexibility is added to each performance by using a range of ensembles: solo instruments, smaller ensembles, and larger groups are regularly included in the same concert.

Radius further enhances its artistic diversity by promoting works of living and younger local composers.  A composer in residence program has featured Jonathan Bailey Holland (2008-2009 season) and Curtis K. Hughes (2007-2008 season).

Guest artists have contributed to the increasing popularity of Radius Ensemble.  For the 2008-2009 season guest artists include Robin Young (of radio station WBUR) as narrator for the Holocaust-inspired There is wind and there are ashes in the wind by Osvaldo Golijov, Robert D. Levin on piano for the Mozart Quintet in E-flat major for piano and winds, K.452, Marcus Thompson on viola for the Brahms String quintet in F, Op. 88, and Fenwick Smith on flute for Shulamit Ran's Mirage for Five Players.

Media Reviews
Radius Ensemble has received positive reviews and accolades over its 10-year history from The Boston Globe

,
Harvard Magazine,

The Boston Musical Intelligencer,

and other publications.

References

External links 
Radius Ensemble website

Chamber music groups
Musical groups established in 1999
Musical groups from Massachusetts
1999 establishments in Massachusetts